The 172nd (Rocky Mountain Rangers) Battalion, CEF was a unit in the Canadian Expeditionary Force during the First World War.  Based in Kamloops, British Columbia, the unit began recruiting during the winter of 1915/16 in Kamloops and district.  After sailing to England in October 1916, the battalion was absorbed into the 24th Reserve Battalion on January 1, 1917.  The 172nd (Rocky Mountain Rangers) Battalion, CEF had one Officer Commanding: Lieut-Col. J. R. Vicars.

Motto
The motto of the Rocky Mountain Rangers was in the Chinook Jargon, a trade language that was popular with settler populations in early British Columbia.  Meaning "stand guard", or "watch well", it was Kloshe Nanitch.

References
Meek, John F. Over the Top! The Canadian Infantry in the First World War. Orangeville, Ont.: The Author, 1971.

Battalions of the Canadian Expeditionary Force
Military units and formations of British Columbia
Kamloops
Rocky Mountain Rangers